Alun Kyte (born 7 July 1964), known as the Midlands Ripper,  is an English double murderer and suspected serial killer. He was convicted in 2000 of the murders of two sex workers, 20-year-old Samo Paull and 30-year-old Tracey Turner, whom he killed in December 1993 and March 1994 respectively. After his conviction, investigators announced their suspicions that Kyte could have been behind a number of other unsolved murders of sex workers across Britain in the 1980s and 1990s. He was apprehended due to the ground-breaking investigations of a wider police enquiry named Operation Enigma, which was launched in 1996 in response to the murders of Paull, Turner and of a large number of other sex workers. Kyte was sentenced to a minimum of 25 years imprisonment for the murders of Paull and Turner.

Operation Enigma, which reviewed the unsolved murders of more than 200 sex workers and vulnerable women across Britain since 1986, continues to influence police investigations today and was described as the first step towards the creation of a violent crime database in Britain.

Early life
Kyte was born in Tittensor, Stoke-on-Trent in 1964. He grew up in Stafford. Kyte was said to be a sickly youngster who suffered from severe asthma, and his family doted on him constantly. After leaving school he worked in a series of odd jobs and eventually became a lorry driver. He was described as a loner and was said to have a violent hatred of women and an unusual interest in prostitutes. He was rarely seen with women and often lived in hostels or bed and breakfasts. He would regularly travel hundreds of miles across Britain, telling acquaintances he was looking for work. He was known at several hospitals and surgeries as he'd seek medication for a number of complaints as he travelled around the country.

Criminal activity
Kyte's itinerant lifestyle allowed him to travel the country in order to scout out his chosen victims of prostitutes. He would in particular frequent motorway service stations. He would ask for services from prostitutes before attacking and robbing them, or both. He was also a prolific conman, involving himself in petty fraud in cheating drivers out of money by claiming he'd 're-tuned' their cars. He changed cars frequently and also used the cars belonging to his supposed customers to trawl the motorways. He would occasionally drive up to 1,000 miles in people's cars and then return them to unwitting customers.

Murder of Samo Paull
In December 1993, Kyte picked up 20-year-old sex worker Samo Paull from Birmingham's Balsall Heath red light district. She was a single parent. She was reported missing on 4 December and was missing for more than three weeks before her partially-clothed body was spotted by a horse rider on 31 December. It was lying in a water-filled ditch by a lay-by outside Swinford, Leicestershire. This was 38 miles from where she was last seen in Birmingham. The site was near to junction 20 of the M1 motorway. Because of the remoteness of the location, there was no CCTV evidence nor any people living nearby who could provide information. All of Paull's possessions had been stolen. Detectives originally focused their enquiries on Paull's boyfriend.

A key witness was a woman who had seen a man in a Brown Ford Sierra car drive through Swinford in early December with a woman in the back seat who appeared to be dead. The witness had previously worked as a pathologist and so had experience in examining dead bodies. The woman was sitting "bolt upright" and had strange marks on her face. The car was covered in mud and the driver appeared to not want to be seen, pulling a hat over his face. When Paull was found dead on 31 December she insisted to police that the dead woman she had seen being driven around was Paull.

Murder of Tracey Turner
On 2 March 1994, Central Television broadcast a reconstruction of Paull's murder. Kyte saw the broadcast and it fuelled his desire to attack another victim. Shortly after the broadcast he abducted 30-year-old Tracey Turner from Hilton Park Services on the M6 Motorway. Turner regularly worked out of motorway service stations across the country. She was virtually deaf. She was found dead the next day at Bitteswell, near Lutterworth, 52 miles from where she was last seen. Similarly to Paull she had been dumped near the M1 motorway, this time near to junction 19. She had been raped, stripped and strangled. She was dumped by the side of the road and was found only six miles from where Paull had been found dead. Police concluded that she had been transported to the location by car and dumped by the side of the road by the killer. At first, no connection was made to the murder of Samo Paull only three months earlier.

An initial suspect was a man who was thought to have been seen speaking to Turner at Hilton Park services. His car's registration was checked and he was traced to Glasgow, but after speaking with him investigators found no evidence to link him to the murder and he was released.

Two days after the murder, Kyte was seen at the service station posing as a newspaper reporter. He told staff he was conducting an investigation into prostitution.

Initial inquiries into the murders of Paull and Turner drew a blank and Kyte was not apprehended.

Other known 1994 attack
It is known that Kyte also attacked a second sex worker in 1994. That March he picked up a sex worker again from the Balsall Heath area of Birmingham and drove to a dark area before pulling out a Stanley knife and holding it to her neck. He ordered her to give him her belongings and take her clothes off, but after she begged for her life and told him that she was three months pregnant Kyte told her to get out and threw her clothes after her. The victim reported the attack to the police but he was not apprehended.

1997 attack and imprisonment
In December 1997, Kyte committed a violent attack and rape of a woman at knife-point in Weston-super-Mare. She had been staying in the same hostel as Kyte and was attacked by him there one night. She managed to escape and report the incident to the police. Police turned up at the hostel and arrested Kyte. Kyte was found guilty of the attack at trial and sentenced to 8 years imprisonment.

Murder investigations

Operation Enigma
At the time, police in Britain were often ineffective at solving the murders of prostitutes. The victims received markedly less sympathy from detectives, their murders were rarely featured prominently in the media, and sex workers were often blamed for making themselves vulnerable. In the six months after Paull's death, four other sex workers, including Tracey Turner, were murdered across Britain, and Leicestershire Police detectives asked for a cross-force investigation. Many of Kyte's crimes were committed across force boundaries, and there was often difficulties in running investigations into such crimes and in sharing resources between forces. The increasing number of unexplained prostitute deaths in the 90s eventually led to the creation in 1996 of Operation Enigma, which was intended to review the unsolved murders of up to 207 women dating back to 1986 which were committed against sex workers or women who "could have been mistaken for sex workers". The operation was run by the National Crime Faculty in Hampshire, and made use of tracking and data analysis techniques from Canada as well as new forensic techniques which detectives hoped would upgrade crime scene samples. Enigma was one of the first steps towards a database for violent crime analysis, and many of its features influence present-day police investigations.

Detectives concluded that many murders of sex workers in the 1990s appeared to have been committed by the same person and investigated the theory that a serial killer or serial killers could be at large. 14 murders were in particular said to have similarities and Enigma concluded that up to four serial killers could be at large. Many of the unsolved murders Enigma investigated were clustered in the Midlands and in Merseyside. Information was shared between police forces around Britain. Detectives concluded that the similar murders of Paull and Turner were likely linked.

Arrest and conviction for murders
When Kyte was arrested in December 1997 for the attack on the woman in Weston-super-Mare, his DNA was taken as part of standard procedure when arresting individuals suspected of a crime. This DNA profile was uploaded onto the national DNA database in March 1998, which revealed a match to a sample taken from the scene of Tracey Turner's murder in 1994. Both Turner's and Paull's murder investigations were then re-opened by Enigma investigators. Kyte was interviewed by these detectives, who decided not to disclose that they had found a DNA link in order to see what his defence would be. He subsequently denied ever using prostitutes. He denied ever having pretended to be a newspaper reporter at Hilton Park Services, but CCTV had captured him doing it. He then revealed that he owned a brown Ford Sierra car, the same type as had been seen by the witness transporting a dead body near to where Samo Paull was found dead. Soon after Kyte was charged with the murders of both Turner and Paull.

At trial, forensic experts said the chances of the DNA found on Turner belonging to anyone else was 33 million to one. Kyte's fellow prison inmates testified that he had boasted of the murders while imprisoned for his 1997 attack. They stated that he had told them that he had killed Turner because she laughed at him during sex, which infuriated him. The prosecution said that the two murders were linked by "type, origin and disposal". Kyte put in a last-minute defence that the reason his semen was found on Turner was because he regularly used prostitutes and had consensual sex with her, saying: "You meet people and have sex with them or a one-night stand and you don't remember it". He was found guilty of both murders by unanimous decision. He was given a minimum 25-year tariff.

Kyte was labelled the "Midlands Ripper" in the press, in part because he was also suspected of having multiple other victims.

Investigations into other possible victims

Operation Enigma had investigated Kyte's potential links to some of the other 200+ cold cases it was re-investigating. Because Kyte lived an itinerant lifestyle and drove across the country, it was believed he could be responsible for other unsolved murders across Britain. In prison Kyte allegedly boasted of killing 12 women in total, which the detective in charge of investigations into his two known murders said "could be true". He is said to have stated to inmates that "you don't pay for that kind of women". There were reports in the media that detectives feared Kyte could have more victims than Peter Sutcliffe. After his conviction in 2000, Leicestershire Police took the unusual step of issuing every police force in Britain with his details and a tape recording of his voice. Detectives in particular noted that Kyte was not known to have committed any attacks between 1994 and 1997, and stated that they suspected that there could have been other unknown victims between these dates. There were several murders that took place when Kyte was known to have been in the vicinity, and it was revealed after Kyte's 2000 conviction that detectives were already planning to speak to Kyte about such murders. Many were committed near motorways or the victim's bodies were found near motorways, similarly to Paull and Turner. The murders investigators announced as possible Kyte victims were:

Yvonne Coley, Birmingham, May 1984.
Gail Whitehouse, Wolverhampton, October 1990.
Janine Downes, Wolverhampton, February 1991. Kyte was working in the area at the time.
Lynne Trenholme, Chester, June 1991.
Barbara Finn, Coventry, October 1992.
Natalie Pearman, Norwich, November 1992.
Carol Clarke, Gloucester, March 1993. Kyte was living in Weston-super-Mare at the time, 20 miles from her flat in Bristol.
Dawn Shields, Sheffield, May 1994. Kyte had recently moved to a residence near to the place she was abducted from and the murder was said to have all the hallmarks of a Kyte killing.
Sharon Harper, Grantham, July 1994.
Julie Finlay, Liverpool, August 1994. Kyte was said to have detailed knowledge of the area she was found.
Tracey Wylde, Glasgow, November 1997.

A link between Kyte and these murders could not be proven at the time because there was no DNA evidence in these cases. However, Enigma detectives believed that Kyte was responsible for other murders. Leicestershire Police assistant chief constable David Colman stated: "I do not believe that we have uncovered the full extent of his criminality and, in particular, there is every reason to believe he may have been responsible for other serious attacks on women". Operation Enigma concluded that there were notable similarities between the murders of Whitehouse, Trenholme, Pearman, Clarke and Shields. Some of the suggested links between Kyte and these murders were later disproven: In 2017, Norfolk Police revealed they had DNA evidence in the Natalie Pearman case, and in 2019 another man was convicted of Wylde's murder. Kyte was originally also linked to the murder of Celine Figard in 1995, but another man was later convicted of the killing. Investigators already have fingerprint evidence in the Trenholme case.

The murder of Dawn Shields was covered in a 2013 documentary as part of the Killers Behind Bars: The Untold Story series. The presenter David Wilson spoke to detectives who were on the Shields case and they visited the site where she was found.

Kyte continues to be regularly linked to many of these murders and to other unsolved killings in the press.

Imprisonment
Kyte had an appeal against his conviction rejected in February 2001.

In 2013 it was announced that Kyte had failed in an appeal against the length of his 25-year minimum sentence. Kyte had argued that the sentence was "too long". It was revealed that Kyte had accepted his culpability in relation to Turner's murder but continued to deny any involvement in the murder of Paull. The judge said that he had not made enough progress in prison to qualify for a reduction in his sentence. Because his appeal was rejected, Kyte will remain in prison until at least 2025.

In popular culture

Books
In 2001, criminal profiler Professor Paul Britton, who worked with detectives on the case, released a book titled Picking up the Pieces which included a section on the case.
In 2007, author Nigel Cawthorne published a book titled The Mammoth Book of Killers at Large which featured a chapter on Operation Enigma.
In 2009, author Vanessa Howard published a book which featured a chapter noting possible links between Kyte and the murder of Birmingham sex worker Janine Downes in 1991. The book was titled Britain's Ten Most Wanted: The Truth Behind the Most Shocking Unsolved Murders.
In 2012, author Stephen Wade included a chapter on Kyte in his book DNA Crime Investigations: Solving Murder and Serious Crime Through DNA and Modern Forensics.

Television
In 2013, Channel 5 broadcast a documentary with high-profile criminologist David Wilson which covered the murder of Dawn Shields, one of Kyte's suspected victims. The episode was part of the Killers Behind Bars: The Untold Story series and was focused on possible links between unsolved crimes and Stephen Griffiths (although Wilson concluded links to Griffiths were unlikely). Wilson spoke to investigators who were on the Shields case and visited the site she was found.
In 2019, Quest released a documentary on Kyte titled Alun Kyte: The Midlands Ripper. It was released as part of the British Police: Our Toughest Cases series and was the fifth episode of series 1. It featured interviews with detectives who investigated Kyte.
In 2020, retired detective Jackie Malton released a documentary on Kyte on CBS Reality as part of her The Real Prime Suspect series. The episode was the fourth episode of series two and was titled A Serial Killer in the Making?.

See also
David Smith, fellow killer of prostitutes in the 90s investigated by Enigma who is also suspected of having claimed more victims
Murders of Jacqueline Ansell-Lamb and Barbara Mayo, unsolved murders committed on British motorways by a similarly transient killer
Operation Anagram, a similarly-named cross-force police investigation into the activities of transient British serial killer Peter Tobin
Murder of Lindsay Rimer, unsolved 1994 murder also re-investigated by Operation Enigma

Other UK cold cases where the offender's DNA is known:
Murder of Deborah Linsley
Murders of Eve Stratford and Lynne Weedon
Murder of Lindsay Rimer
Murder of Lyn Bryant
Murder of Janet Brown
Murder of Linda Cook 
Murder of Melanie Hall
Batman rapist, subject to Britain's longest-running serial rape investigation

References

Cited works

External links
 Prime Video link to 2019 Kyte documentary

1964 births
1993 crimes in the United Kingdom
1993 in England
1993 murders in the United Kingdom
1994 crimes in the United Kingdom
1994 in England
1994 murders in the United Kingdom
1997 crimes in the United Kingdom
2000 in England
20th-century British criminals
British male criminals
British people convicted of murder
British prisoners sentenced to life imprisonment
Crime in Bristol
Crime in Leicestershire
Crime in Somerset
Leicester
Living people
Male murderers
Murder in England
Murder in Leicestershire
Prisoners and detainees of England and Wales
Suspected serial killers
Unsolved murders in England
Violence against sex workers in the United Kingdom